is a Japanese animation studio owned by TV Asahi and founded in Tokyo in 1965 as A-Production by Daikichirō Kusube, who was previously an animator for Toei Animation. Shin-Ei is known for being the animation studio behind two of the anime television series: Doraemon and Crayon Shin-chan, which still run on Japanese TV since 1979 and 1992 respectively. In April 2017, SynergySP became a subsidiary of the company.

Work list
Works currently airing on Japanese television are in bold.

Television
As A-Production

1970s
 Shin Obake no Q-Taro (1971–72, co-production with Tokyo Movie Shinsha)
 Doraemon '73 (1973)
 Ganso Tensai Bakabon (1975–77, co-production with Tokyo Movie Shinsha)
Ore wa Teppei (1977–78, co-production with Nippon Animation)
Highschool Baseball Ninja (1978)

As Shin-Ei Animation

1970s
Doraemon (1979–2005)
Heart of the Red Bird (1979)

1980s
Kaibutsu-kun (September 2, 1980 – September 28, 1982)
Ninja Hattori-kun (September 28, 1981 – December 25, 1987)
Game Center Arashi (1982)
Fukuchan (1982–84)
Perman (April 4, 1983 – March 31, 1985) (co-production with TMS Entertainment)
Oyoneko Boonyan (1984)
Pro Golfer Saru (1985–88, co-produced with Studio Deen)
Obake no Q-Taro (April 1, 1985 – March 29, 1987)
Esper Mami (April 7, 1987 – October 26, 1989)
Ultra B (1987–89)
Tsurupika Hagemaru-kun (1987–89)
New Pro Golfer Saru (1988)
Biriken (1988–89)
Oishinbo (October 17, 1988 – March 17, 1992)
Obotchama-kun (1989–92)
Biriken Nandemo Shokai (1989)
The Laughing Salesman (October 10, 1989 – September 29, 1992)
Chimpui (November 2, 1989 – April 18, 1991)

1990s
Gatapishi (1990–91)
Fujio Fujiko A's Mumako (1990) Hurst Greatest (1990)
808 Cho Hyori Kewaishi (1990)
Dororonpa! (1991)
21 Emon (May 2, 1991 – March 26, 1992)
Crayon Shin-chan (April 13, 1992 – present)
Sasurai-kun (1992)
Manmaru the Ninja Penguin (1997–98) Handy Dakota (1997)
Yoshimoto Muchikko Monogatari (1998) SimkyaBoo3d (1998)
Weekly Storyland (1999–2001) General Castle (1999)

2000s
Haré+Guu (2001)
Atashin'chi (2002–09)
Ninja Hattori-kun (2004–08)
Doraemon (2005–present)
Futatsu no Kurumi/Two Walnuts (2007)
Gokyoudai Monogatari (2009–10)

2010s
Stitch! ~Zutto Saikō no Tomodachi~(Stitch! Best Friends Forever) (2010–11, co-produced by Disney)
The Knight in the Area (2012)
Ninja Hattori-kun (2013–present, co-produced with Reliance MediaWorks)
Kuromajo-san ga Toru!! (2012–2014)
My Neighbor Seki (2014)
Denkigai no Honya-san (2014)
Mysterious Joker (2014–2016)
Sweetness and Lightning (2016, co-produced with TMS Entertainment)
Trickster (2016, co-produced with TMS Entertainment)
Shin Atashin'chi (2016) 
The Laughing Salesman NEW (2017)
Elegant Yokai Apartment Life (2017)
Pochitto Hatsumei: Pikachin-Kit (2018–2020, co-produced with OLM)
Teasing Master Takagi-san (2018–2022)
Barangay 143 (2018–2019, co-produced with ASI Studios, Inc. and credited as TV Asahi)
Null & Peta (2019)

2020s
The 8th Son? Are You Kidding Me? (2020)
Kin Daa Terebi (2020, co-produced with Lesprit)
Super Spy Ryan (2020, Animated segments, co-produced with Sunlight Entertainment and Pocket.watch)
Pui Pui Molcar / Pui Pui Molcar Driving School (2021–2022, co-produced with Japan Green Hearts)
Idolls! (2021)
Those Snow White Notes (2021)
iii Icecrin (2021–present, co-produced with TIA)
The World Ends with You the Animation (2021, co-produced with DOMERICA)
A Couple of Cuckoos (2022, co-produced with SynergySP)
Chimimo (2022)
The Dangers in My Heart (2023)
Mr. Villain's Day Off (TBA, co-produced with SynergySP)

Films
Tenguri, Boy of the Plains (December 21, 1977)
Doraemon: Nobita's Dinosaur (March 15, 1980)
Doraemon: The Records of Nobita, Spaceblazer (March 14, 1981)
Kaibutsu-kun: Invitation to Kaibutsu Land (March 14, 1981)
21 Emon: Uchū e Irasshai! (August 1, 1981) 
Doraemon: What Am I for Momotaro (August 1, 1981) - short film
Doraemon: Ken-chan's Adventure (1981) - short film
Doraemon: Nobita and the Haunts of Evil (March 13, 1982)
Kaibutsu-kun: The Demon Sword (March 13, 1982)
Ninja Hattori-kun: Nin Nin Ninpo Enikki no Maki (March 13, 1982)
Ninja Hattori-kun: Nin Nin Furusato Daisakusen no Maki (March 12, 1983)
Doraemon: Nobita and the Castle of the Undersea Devil (March 12, 1983)
Perman: The Birdman Has Arrived!! (March 12, 1983)
Ninja Hattori-kun + Perman: ESP Wars (March 17, 1984)
Doraemon: Nobita's Great Adventure into the Underworld (March 17, 1984)
Doraemon: Nobita's Little Star Wars (March 16, 1985)
Ninja Hattori-kun + Perman: Ninja Beast Jippō vs. Miracle Egg (March 16, 1985)
Doraemon: Nobita and the Steel Troops (March 15, 1986)
Obake no Q-Taro: Tobidase! Bake Bake Daisakusen (March 15, 1986) - short film
Pro Golfer Saru: Super Golf World e no Chōsen!! (March 15, 1986)
Pro Golfer Saru: Kōga Hikyō! Kage no Ninpō Golfer Sanjō! (March 14, 1987)
Obake no Q-Taro: Susume! 1/100 Daisakusen (March 14, 1987) - short film
Doraemon: Nobita and the Knights on Dinosaurs (March 14, 1987)
Doraemon: The Record of Nobita's Parallel Visit to the West (March 12, 1988)
ESPer Mami: Hoshizora no Dancing Doll (March 12, 1988)
Ultra B: Black Hole kara no Dokusaisha BB!! (March 12, 1988) - short film
Doraemon: Nobita and the Birth of Japan (March 11, 1989)
Dorami-chan: Mini-Dora SOS!!! (March 11, 1989)
Doraemon: Nobita and the Animal Planet (March 10, 1990)
Chinpui: Eri-sama Katsudō Daishashin (March 10, 1990)
Doraemon: Nobita's Dorabian Nights (March 9, 1991)
Dorami-chan: Wow, The Kid Gang of Bandits! (March 9, 1991)
Doraemon: Nobita and the Kingdom of Clouds (March 7, 1992)
21-Emon: To Space! The Barefoot Princess (March 7, 1992)
In a Thrilling, Solar Car (March 7, 1992) - short film
Doraemon: Nobita and the Tin Labyrinth (March 6, 1993)
Dorami-chan: Hello, Dynosis Kids!! (March 6, 1993)
The Sun Is Our Friend: Hold Out, the Soraemon! (March 6, 1993)
Crayon Shin-chan: Action Mask vs. Leotard Devil (July 24, 1993)
Doraemon: Nobita's Three Visionary Swordsmen (March 12, 1994)
Dorami-chan: A Blue Straw Hat (March 12, 1994)
Umeboshi Denka: Uchū no Hate kara Panparopan! (March 12, 1994)
Crayon Shin-chan: The Secret Treasure of Buri Buri Kingdom  (April 23, 1994)
Doraemon: Nobita to Mirai Note (1994)
Doraemon: Nobita's Diary of the Creation of the World (March 4, 1995)
2112: The Birth of Doraemon (March 4, 1995) - short film
Crayon Shin-chan: Unkokusai's Ambition (April 15, 1995)
Doraemon: Nobita and the Galaxy Super-express (March 2, 1996)
Dorami & Doraemons: Robot School's Seven Mysteries (March 2, 1996) - short film
Crayon Shin-chan: Great Adventure in Henderland (April 13, 1996)
Doraemon: Nobita and the Spiral City (March 8, 1997)
The Doraemons: The Puzzling Challenge Letter of the Mysterious Thief Dorapan (March 8, 1997) - short film
Crayon Shin-chan: Pursuit of the Balls of Darkness (April 19, 1997)
Doraemon: Nobita's Great Adventure in the South Seas (March 7, 1998)
Doraemon Comes Back (March 7, 1998) - short film
The Doraemons: The Great Operating of Stinging Insects! (March 7, 1998) - short film
Crayon Shin-chan: Blitzkrieg! Pig's Hoof's Secret Mission (April 18, 1998)
Doraemon: Nobita Drifts in the Universe (March 6, 1999)
Doraemon: Nobita's the Night Before a Wedding (March 6, 1999) - short film
The Doraemons: Funny Candy of Okashinana!? (March 6, 1999)
Crayon Shin-chan: Explosion! The Hot Spring's Feel Good Final Battle (April 17, 1999)
Doraemon: Nobita and the Legend of the Sun King (March 4, 2000)
Doraemon: A Grandmother's Recollections (March 4, 2000) - short film
The Doraemons: Doki Doki Wildcat Engine (March 4, 2000) - short film
Crayon Shin-chan: Jungle That Invites Storm (April 22, 2000)
Doraemon: Nobita and the Winged Braves (March 10, 2001)
Doraemon: Ganbare! Gian!! (March 10, 2001) - short film
Dorami & Doraemons: Space Land's Critical Event (March 10, 2001)
Crayon Shin-chan: Fierceness That Invites Storm! The Adult Empire Strikes Back (April 21, 2001)
Doraemon: Nobita in the Robot Kingdom (March 9, 2002)
Doraemon: The Day When I Was Born (March 9, 2002) - short film
The Doraemons: Goal! Goal! Goal!! (March 9, 2002) - short film
Crayon Shin-chan: Fierceness That Invites Storm! The Battle of the Warring States (April 20, 2002)
Doraemon: Nobita and the Windmasters (March 8, 2003)
Pa-Pa-Pa the Movie: Perman (March 8, 2003)
Crayon Shin-chan: Fierceness That Invites Storm! Yakiniku Road of Honor (April 19, 2003)
Pa-Pa-Pa the Movie: Perman: Tako de Pon! Ashi wa Pon! (March 6, 2004)
Doraemon: Nobita in the Wan-Nyan Spacetime Odyssey (March 6, 2004)
Doraemon's 25th Anniversary (March 6, 2004)
Crayon Shin-chan: Fierceness That Invites Storm! The Kasukabe Boys of the Evening Sun (April 17, 2004)
Crayon Shin-chan: The Legend Called Buri Buri 3 Minutes Charge (April 16, 2005)
Doraemon: Nobita's Dinosaur 2006 (March 4, 2006)
Crayon Shin-chan: The Legend Called: Dance! Amigo! (April 15, 2006)
Doraemon: Nobita's New Great Adventure into the Underworld (March 10, 2007)
Crayon Shin-chan: Fierceness That Invites Storm! The Singing Buttocks Bomb (April 21, 2007)
Summer Days with Coo (July 28, 2007)
Doraemon: Nobita and the Green Giant Legend (March 8, 2008)
Crayon Shin-chan: Fierceness That Invites Storm! The Hero of Kinpoko (April 19, 2008)
Doraemon the Movie: Nobita's Spaceblazer (March 7, 2009)
Crayon Shin-chan: Roar! Kasukabe Animal Kingdom (April 18, 2009)
Doraemon: Nobita's Great Battle of the Mermaid King (March 6, 2010)
Crayon Shin-chan: Super-Dimension! The Storm Called My Bride (April 17, 2010)
Doraemon: Nobita and the New Steel Troops—Winged Angels (March 5, 2011)
Crayon Shin-chan: Fierceness That Invites Storm! Operation Golden Spy (April 16, 2011)
Doraemon: Nobita and the Island of Miracles—Animal Adventure (March 3, 2012)
Crayon Shin-chan: Fierceness That Invites Storm! Me and the Space Princess (April 14, 2012)
Doraemon: Nobita's Secret Gadget Museum (March 9, 2013)
Crayon Shin-chan: Very Tasty! B-class Gourmet Survival!! (April 20, 2013)
Doraemon: New Nobita's Great Demon—Peko and the Exploration Party of Five (March 8, 2014)
Crayon Shin-chan: Intense Battle! Robo Dad Strikes Back (April 19, 2014)
Stand by Me Doraemon (with Shirogumi and Robot Communications) (August 8, 2014)
Doraemon: Nobita's Space Heroes (March 7, 2015)
Crayon Shin-chan: My Moving Story! Cactus Large Attack! (April 18, 2015)
Doraemon: Nobita and the Birth of Japan 2016 (March 5, 2016)
Crayon Shin-chan: Fast Asleep! The Great Assault on Dreamy World! (April 16, 2016)
Doraemon the Movie 2017: Great Adventure in the Antarctic Kachi Kochi (March 4, 2017)
Crayon Shin-chan: Invasion!! Alien Shiriri (April 15, 2017)
Doraemon the Movie 2018: Nobita's Treasure Island (March 3, 2018)
Crayon Shin-chan: Burst Serving! Kung Fu Boys ~Ramen Rebellion~ (April 13, 2018)
Doraemon the Movie 2019: Nobita's Chronicle of the Moon Exploration (March 1, 2019)
Crayon Shin-chan: Honeymoon Hurricane ~The Lost Hiroshi~ (April 19, 2019)
Doraemon: Nobita's New Dinosaur (August 7, 2020)
Crayon Shin-chan: Crash! Rakuga Kingdom and Almost Four Heroes (September 11, 2020)
Stand by Me Doraemon 2 (November 20, 2020)
Crayon Shin-chan: Shrouded in Mystery! The Flower of Tenkazu Academy (July 30, 2021)
Doraemon: Nobita's Little Star Wars 2021 (March 4, 2022)
Teasing Master Takagi-san: The Movie (June 10, 2022)
Totto-Chan: The Little Girl at the Window (Q4 2023)
Ghost Cat Anzu (TBA) (co-production with Miyu Productions)

Television specials
Doraemon's Time Capsule for 2001 (January 1, 1980)
Dora・Q・Perman (April 8, 1980)
Doraemon Meets Hattori the Ninja (January 3, 1982)
Kaibutsu-kun: Hiroshi's Betrayal (April 3, 1982)
Pro Golfer Saru (October 9, 1982)
Doraemon: Europe Rail Travel (October 18, 1983)
Sangokushi (March 20, 1985)
Mr. Pen Pen (March 31, 1986)
Doraemon: Summer Holiday (April 4, 1986)
Sangokushi II: Amakakeru Otokotachi (August 22, 1986) 
Mr. Pen Pen II (December 29, 1986)
Doraemon and Itchy the Stray (January 2, 1987)
Doraemon: Treasure of the Shinugumi Mountain (August 12, 1988)
Fujiko Fujio A no Mumako (July 3, 1990)
Oishinbo: Kyūkyoku Tai Shikō, Chōju Ryōri Taiketsu!! (December 11, 1992)
The Laughing Salesman Special (December 26, 1992)
Doraemon: Featherplace (April 2, 1993)
Oishinbo: Nichibei Kome Sensō (December 3, 1993)
The Laughing Salesman: Supersize Spring Issue (April 6, 1993)
The Laughing Salesman: Supersize Forgotten Year Issue (December 28, 1993)
Tamio Kageyama's Double Fantasy (January 2, 1994)
Tatsuya Nakazaki's Super Gag Theater (January 16 - August 21, 1994)
Sensō Dōwa (August 15, 2002 - August 13, 2009)
Shiroi Koibito (December 23, 2006)
Stitch and the Planet of Sand (June 16, 2012)
Stitch! Perfect Memory (August 7, 2015)

References

External links
 SHIN-EI ANIMATION Official Site 
 
 

 
Japanese companies established in 1976
Animation studios in Tokyo
Mass media companies established in 1976
Film production companies of Japan
Japanese animation studios
Nishitōkyō, Tokyo
TV Asahi